Michael Occhipinti is a Canadian jazz guitarist and composer. A founding member of the Neufeld-Occhipinti Jazz Orchestra, he is most noted as a three-time Juno Award nominee for Contemporary Jazz Album of the Year, receiving nominations at the Juno Awards of 2001 for his album Creation Dream, at the Juno Awards of 2008 for Chasing After Light, and at the Juno Awards of 2009 for The Sicilian Jazz Project.

He is also a frequent collaborator with his older brother Roberto Occhipinti. Their cousin David Occhipinti is also a Juno-nominated jazz musician.

References

20th-century Canadian male musicians
21st-century Canadian male musicians
Canadian jazz guitarists
Canadian jazz composers
Canadian people of Sicilian descent
Musicians from Toronto
Living people
Year of birth missing (living people)